In Marxist theory, a semi-colony is a country which is officially an independent and sovereign nation, but which is in reality very much dependent and dominated by an imperialist country (or, in some cases, several imperialist countries).

This domination could take different forms -

economic (the supply of capital, technology or goods, and control over strategic assets and foreign trade),
political (direct intervention by the imperialist country in the political affairs of the semi-colony to secure client-regimes), 
military (the presence or control exercised by foreign troops)  
cultural/ideological (e.g. the imposition of a foreign culture or foreign religion on the local population through the media, education and foreign consumer products). 
technological (the dependence on foreign technology, or the technological domination by a foreign country).
demographic (settler colonialism - the immigration into the semi-colony of large numbers of settlers from the imperialist countries which dominate the semi-colony.)

The term semi-colony is often used interchangeably with "neo-colony". Some semi-colonies never had much of a colonial administration before they became formally sovereign states, but most of them did. Some semi-colonies were "settler colonies" attracting large numbers of foreign immigrants, while in other semi-colonies the indigenous population always remained the vast majority.

Client relationship

The relationship between the semi-colony and the country (or countries) dominating it is said to benefit: 
the position of semi-colonial elite or ruling class (which serves both its own interest and the interests of foreign investors and creditors) and 
the imperialist country, which obtains profits and cheap resources from its investments in the semi-colony.

The semi-colonial situation however disadvantages the working majority of the population, insofar as balanced economic development is impossible - only those industries are developed which benefit foreign investors or which benefit the export trade (usually extractive and agricultural industries).

The class structure of a typical semi-colony features a large mass of peasants and unemployed, a relatively small urban working class and middle class, a strong landowning class, and an urban comprador bourgeoisie.

Many semi-colonies in Africa, Asia and Latin America are, according to some Marxists, dominated by the imperialist countries which once colonised them, or by other imperialist powers. Some countries may never have been a colony but are nonetheless dominated by a superpower such as the United States or they were formerly dominated by the Soviet Union.

Marxists regard semi-colonies differently from what they regard as genuinely independent nations, and will often support a semi-colony in a struggle against its dominating power, reasoning that it will help resolve the national question and thus promote class struggle.

Origins of the term

The concept of a semi-colony originated in the earlier years of the Communist International, which initially classified the countries of the world as being either imperialist countries, semi-colonies, and colonies. From that definition followed a political strategy for the labour movement in each type of country (for example as regards nationalisation of industry, workers' rights, democratisation, the ownership of land). The general perspective of the Communist International was that it was impossible for semi-colonial countries to achieve substantive industrialisation and transform property relations without a socialist and democratic revolution. In other words, the power of semi-colonial elite had to be overthrown by the workers and peasants, to liberate the country from its client-relationship with foreign powers, and make comprehensive local economic development possible.

The category of "intermediate countries" was introduced in the later 1920s. Thus, for example, at the 15th Congress of the CPSU in 1927, Stalin stated: “Judge for yourselves. Of the 1,905 million inhabitants of the entire globe, 1,134 million live in the colonies and dependent countries, 143,000,000 live in the U.S.S.R., 264,000,000 live in the intermediate countries, and only 363,000,000 live in the big imperialist countries, which oppress the colonies and dependent countries.” 

The term "semi-colony" has continued to be used particularly in the Maoist movement, for instance, all three of the Shining Path, Communist Party of India (Maoist) and the Communist Party of the Philippines characterize their respective countries as "semi-colonies".

Controversy

However, with the expansion of the world market and globalisation especially from the 1970s onwards, the "semi-colonial" status of particular countries became more ambiguous because a number of them were able to industrialise to a significant extent so that they became at least "semi-industrialised" countries. They gained somewhat more financial, political and cultural autonomy, and in some cases, the local elite became a major foreign investor in its own right. On the other side, it was no longer very clear that they were under the control of another foreign country, rather than being dominated by a bloc of several wealthier countries, or by international financial institutions.

This raised the question of whether the concept of a "semi-colony" is still relevant. Whatever the case, the definition of a country as a semi-colony as such refers to specific analysis of its place in the world economy and world trade, as well as its local political and economic culture.

Some Trotskyist groups, such as the League for a Fifth International interpret Lenin's analysis of imperialism in a way which defines the vast majority of states in the world as semi-colonies, including all of Eastern Europe.

Examples
 Several Middle Eastern states established under British patronage, including many Arab countries and Israel, are now largely dependent militarily and economically on the US

See also

Dependency theory
Imperialism
National question
Neocolonialism
Satellite state

References

Ernest Mandel, "Semicolonial Countries and Semi-Industrialised Dependent Countries", New International (New York), No.5, 1985, pp. 149–175).
Stanley L. Engerman & Kenneth L. Sokoloff, Colonialism, inequality, and long-run paths of development. Cambridge, MA : National Bureau of Economic Research, 2005.
Donald Denoon, Settler Capitalism: The Dynamics of Dependent Development in the Southern Hemisphere. Oxford University Press, 1983.
Jack Woddis, An introduction to neo-colonialism. London: Lawrence & Wishart, 1967.
The Communist International, 1919-1943; documents, selected and edited by Jane Degras. Oxford University Press, 1956-65. 
“The Dynamics of World Revolution Today”, resolution adopted at the 1963 Reunification Congress of the Fourth International.
Michael Löwy, The politics of uneven and combined development. Verso.
Ronald H. Chilcote, Imperialism: Theoretical Directions. 
Ronald H. Chilcote, The Political Economy of Imperialism.
Ronald H. Chilcote, Dependency and Marxism: Toward a Resolution of the Debate.

External links 
 The relationship between semi-colonialism and semi-feudalism 
 Capitalist or semi-feudal semi-colonial countries?

Colonialism
Neocolonialism